Rakibul Hussain (born 7 August 1964) is an Indian politician from Assam who is serving as the Deputy Leader of the Opposition in the Assam Legislative Assembly since 2021. He represents the Samaguri constituency in the  Assam Legislative Assembly from Indian National Congress since 2001. He was also Minister of Forest and Environment and Panchayat and Rural Development,Government of Assam in the  Tarun Gogoi ministry III from 2011 to 2016,Minister of Environment and Forest, Tourism,Information and Public Relation, Printing and Stationery etc.,Government of Assam in the Tarun Gogoi ministry II from 2006 to 2011, Minister of State,Home,Political,Passport,HAJ,BAD,Information Technology,Printing and Stationery etc., Government of Assam in the Tarun Gogoi I ministry from 2004 to 2006 and Minister of State for Home (Jail and Home Guards), Border Area Development, Passport,Government of Assam in the Tarun Gogoi ministry I from 2002 to 2006.  Sports Activities -- Rakibul Hussain was former General Secretary of Assam Olympic Association.From 2015,he is the President of All India Carrom Federation.

References 

1964 births
Living people
Assam MLAs 2001–2006
Assam MLAs 2006–2011
Assam MLAs 2011–2016
Assam MLAs 2016–2021
Assam MLAs 2021–2026
Indian National Congress politicians from Assam